John Jones (1872—1950) was a politician in Queensland, Australia. He was a Member of the Queensland Legislative Assembly.

Politics
Jones was a member of the Dalrymple Shire Council from 1905 to 1925 and its chairman from 1919 to 1920.

As a member of the Northern Country Party, Jones contested the 1920 election in the electoral district of Kennedy and was elected on 9 October 1920. He held the seat until the 1923 election on 12 May 1923.

References

Members of the Queensland Legislative Assembly
1872 births
1950 deaths